The 1989–90 daytime network television schedule for the three major English-language commercial broadcast networks in the United States covers the weekday and weekend daytime hours from September 1989 to August 1990.

Legend

 New series are highlighted in bold.

Schedule
 All times correspond to U.S. Eastern and Pacific Time scheduling (except for some live sports or events). Except where affiliates slot certain programs outside their network-dictated timeslots, subtract one hour for Central, Mountain, Alaska, and Hawaii-Aleutian times.
 Local schedules may differ, as affiliates have the option to pre-empt or delay network programs. Such scheduling may be limited to preemptions caused by local or national breaking news or weather coverage (which may force stations to tape delay certain programs to later timeslots) and any major sports events scheduled to air in a weekday timeslot (mainly during major holidays). Stations may air shows at other times at their preference.

Monday–Friday

Saturday

Sunday

By network

ABC

Returning series
ABC Weekend Special
ABC World News This Morning
ABC World News Tonight with Peter Jennings
All My Children 
Animal Crack-Ups
The Bugs Bunny and Tweety Show
Adventures of the Gummi Bears (moved from NBC)
The Flintstone Kids 
General Hospital
Good Morning America
The Home Show
Loving
Match Game
The New Adventures of Winnie the Pooh
One Life to Live
A Pup Named Scooby-Doo
Slimer! and the Real Ghostbusters
This Week with David Brinkley

New series
Beetlejuice
Perfect Strangers 

Not returning from 1988–89
Growing Pains 
The New Adventures of Beany and Cecil
Ryan's Hope

CBS

Returning series
The Adventures of Raggedy Ann and Andy 
As the World Turns
The Bold and the Beautiful
CBS Evening News
CBS Morning News
CBS News Sunday Morning
CBS Storybreak 
CBS This Morning
Face the Nation
Family Feud
Garfield and Friends
Guiding Light
Jim Henson's Muppet Babies
Pee-wee's Playhouse
The Price Is Right
Wheel of Fortune
The Young and the Restless

New series
The California Raisins Show
Dink, the Little Dinosaur
Rude Dog and the Dweebs

Not returning from 1988–89
Card Sharks
Flip!
Hey Vern, It's Ernest!
Mighty Mouse: The New Adventures
Now You See It
Superman
Teen Wolf

NBC

Returning series
ALF 
ALF Tales
Another World
The Chipmunks
Classic Concentration 
Days of Our Lives
Generations
The Golden Girls 
Kissyfur
Meet the Press
NBC News at Sunrise
NBC Nightly News
Santa Barbara
Scrabble
The Smurfs
Today

New series
227 
Camp Candy
Captain N: The Game Master
The Karate Kid
Let's Make a Deal
The Marsha Warfield Show
Saved by the Bell

Not returning from 1988–89
2 Hip 4 TV
Disney's Adventures of the Gummi Bears (moved to ABC)
The Completely Mental Misadventures of Ed Grimley
Fat Albert and the Cosby Kids 
The New Archies 
Punky Brewster 
Sale of the Century
Super Password
Wheel of Fortune (moved to CBS)
Win, Lose or Draw

See also
1989-90 United States network television schedule (prime-time)
1989-90 United States network television schedule (late night)

Sources
https://web.archive.org/web/20071015122215/http://curtalliaume.com/abc_day.html
https://web.archive.org/web/20071015122235/http://curtalliaume.com/cbs_day.html
https://web.archive.org/web/20071012211242/http://curtalliaume.com/nbc_day.html

United States weekday network television schedules
1989 in American television
1990 in American television